T51 may refer to:

Vehicles 
 Bugatti T51, a 1931 racing car 
 Cessna T-51, used by the United States Air Force Academy Flying Team
 Cooper T51, a 1959 Formula One and Formula Two racing car
 Slingsby T.51 Dart, a British glider
 Titan T-51 Mustang, a three-quarter size replica of the P-51 Mustang

Other uses 
 T51 (classification), a wheelchair racing class
 Continental T51, a turboshaft engine
 Dan Jones International Airport, in Harris County, Texas, United States
 T.51/ISO/IEC 6937, an ITU standard defining a multi-byte character set